The 1938 Wisconsin Badgers football team was an American football team that represented the University of Wisconsin in the 1938 Big Ten Conference football season. The team compiled a 5–3 record (3–2 against conference opponents) and finished in fifth place in the Big Ten Conference. Harry Stuhldreher was in his third year as Wisconsin's head coach.

Fullback Howard Weiss was selected by the International News Service as a first-team player on the 1938 College Football All-America Team. He also won the Chicago Tribune Silver Football as the most valuable player in the Big Ten. He also finished sixth in the voting for the Heisman Trophy and was also selected as Wisconsin's most valuable player. Ralph Moeller was the team captain. Howard Weiss and center Jack Murray were selected by the Associated Press and United Press as first-team players on the 1938 All-Big Ten Conference football team.

The team played its home games at Camp Randall Stadium, which had a capacity of 36,000. During the 1938 season, the average attendance at home games was 31,731.

Schedule

References

Wisconsin
Wisconsin Badgers football seasons
Wisconsin Badgers football